David Scott Mitchell (19 March 1836 – 24 July 1907) was a collector of Australian books, founder and benefactor of the Mitchell Library, at the State Library of New South Wales, Sydney.

Early life
In 1836 Mitchell was born in Sydney, the son of Dr James Mitchell and his wife Augusta Maria Frederick, née Scott. James Mitchell came to Australia in 1821 as an army surgeon, and two years later was appointed assistant surgeon at the military hospital, Macquarie Street, Sydney, of which he became head in 1825. James Mitchell afterwards became the owner of 50,000 acres (200 km2) in the Hunter River valley which included rich coal-bearing land. James and Augusta are commemorated by a window in the Garrison Church. David Mitchell was born at Sydney Hospital, grew up in Cumberland Street, Sydney and in October 1852, aged 16, became one of the first seven undergraduate students in the newly established University of Sydney in 1852. Mitchell won scholarships in mathematics and graduated B.A. in 1856 with honours in classics, and M.A. in 1859.

Mitchell was called to the bar but did not practise law or any other profession. It was said that he declined the position of attorney-general. Mitchell assisted in the management of the Hunter River estates. Mitchell was a good cricketer and dancer, a skilful whist player, and a good amateur actor. Allegedly, he broke off a romance with Emily Matilda Manning, daughter of William Montagu Manning. Mitchell was already forming a collection of books. Mitchell's father died in 1869 and there was a lawsuit over the will. Publication of the family affairs was humiliating to a man of Mitchell's sensitive disposition.

Book collector

Mitchell was affected by the death of his mother greatly and began to withdraw from the world; his health was never robust. The formation of his library became his chief interest. He began to build up a fine library of English literature, specialising in poetry and sixteenth and seventeenth century books. In 1866, perhaps on the encouragement of George Robertson of Angus & Robertson, he began to collect early Australian books and manuscripts. In his search for books he was "largely indebted to the efforts of booksellers who knew Australiana, including George Robertson, Fred W. Wymark, William Dymock and James R. Tyrrell". Once a week, he went the round of the bookshops; by now, book collecting had become all-consuming. Mitchell had a good memory and discrimination, but as time went on he saw that even the most obscure and apparently worthless pamphlet might throw some light on its time. Though withdrawn from society, he welcomed genuine students such as Arthur Wilberforce Jose and Bertram Stevens, especially if they were interested in Australian problems. Mitchell also purchased books from other collectors, most notably Mitchell purchased the 3,300-volume Australian collection of Alfred Lee in 1906.

Library foundation

Mitchell was anxious that the (then) colony of New South Wales might have the benefit of his collections. Eventually, after a conference with the Sydney public librarian, he informed the trustees on 17 October 1898 that he was willing to bequeath his collection to the library, if a suitable building were provided and if the books would be available to students. The offer was accepted. However, there was a long delay in starting a building and Mitchell suggested that the bequest would be cancelled if the books were not housed a year after the owner's death. 

In June 1905, the Premier of New South Wales, Joseph Carruthers, instructed the government architect to prepare designs for a library and the work was begun early in 1906. Mitchell died on 24 July 1907 and his entire collection became the property of the state. Additionally, a sum of £70,000 was bequeathed, the income from which has been spent in adding to the collection.

Other activities

Mitchell was the first patron of the Royal Australian Historical Society in 1901.

Later life, death and legacy
Mitchell's reclusiveness did not allow him to agree to having his portrait painted. The portrait prefixed to the centenary volume was painted from a photograph, after his death. He would never be interviewed and his kindliness was only known to a few students. He did not marry, but was glad to think that the library would be a permanent memorial of his family.

Mitchell was buried in Rookwood Cemetery.

In 1936, the centenary of Mitchell's birth, the trustees of the Public Library of New South Wales published The Mitchell Library, Sydney, Historical and Descriptive Notes. Written by the librarian Miss Ida Leeson, this publication describes some of the original manuscripts and books that may be found in the library.

Further reading
James R. Tyrrell, David Scott Mitchell: A Reminiscence (Sydney: Sunnybrook Press, 1936)

See also
 Angus & Robertson
 William Dixson

References

External links

David Scott Mitchell at Philanthropy Wiki
  
David Scott Mitchell Memorial Fellowship – encourages the use of the Mitchell Library for study and research of Australian history
 [CC-By-SA] 

1836 births
1907 deaths
People from Sydney
Australian book and manuscript collectors
19th-century Australian philanthropists